John Howland (26 April 1895 – 4 April 1958) was an English cricketer. Howland was a right-handed batsman. He was born at Stow-on-the-Wold, Gloucestershire.

Howland made his first-class debut for Gloucestershire against Warwickshire at Edgbaston in the 1922 County Championship. He made twelve further first-class appearances for the county, the last of which came against Kent at the Nevill Ground, Tunbridge Wells, in the 1923 County Championship. In his sixteen first-class matches, he scored 128 runs at an average of 6.40, with a high score of 23.

He died at Oxford, Oxfordshire, on 4 April 1958.

References

External links
John Howman at ESPNcricinfo
John Howman at CricketArchive

1895 births
1958 deaths
People from Stow-on-the-Wold
English cricketers
Gloucestershire cricketers
Sportspeople from Gloucestershire